Linyang Temple is a Buddhist temple located in the Jin'an District of Fuzhou, Fujian.

History

Tang dynasty
According to Three Mountains Annals, the temple was first built in 931 with the name of Linyang-yuan, in the reign of Emperor Mingzong (926–933) of the Later Tang (923–937). But the Mindu-ji says that the temple was originally built in 936, in the ruling of Shi Jingtang (936–942) in the Later Jin (Five Dynasties) (936–947).

Ming dynasty
Linyang Temple was restored and renovated in 1612, in the 40th year of Wanli period (1573–1620) in the late Ming dynasty (1368–1644).

Qing dynasty
During the Guangxu era (1875–1908) of the late Qing dynasty (1644–1911), master Guyue raised funds to restore and redecorate the temple.

Republic of China
In 1930, Yuan Ying was proposed as the new abbot of Linyang Temple.

People's Republic of China
After the 3rd Plenary Session of the 11th Central Committee of the Chinese Communist Party, according to the national policy of free religious belief, Linyang Temple was officially reopened to the public in 1981. The temple has been designated as a National Key Buddhist Temple in Han Chinese Area by the State Council of China in 1983.

Architecture
The complex include the following halls: Shanmen, Mahavira Hall, Hall of Four Heavenly Kings, Hall of Great Compassion, Hall of Ksitigarbha, Bell tower, Drum tower, Hall of Guru, Dharma Hall, Dining Room, etc.

References

Buddhist temples in Fuzhou
Buildings and structures in Fuzhou
Tourist attractions in Fuzhou
17th-century establishments in China
17th-century Buddhist temples
Religious buildings and structures completed in 1612